Shagdaryn Chanrav (20 November 1948 – 10 August 2007) was a Mongolian judoka. He competed in the men's half-middleweight event at the 1976 Summer Olympics.

References

1948 births
2007 deaths
Mongolian male judoka
Olympic judoka of Mongolia
Judoka at the 1976 Summer Olympics
People from Bayankhongor Province